Jean Louis Nicodé (12 August 18535 October 1919) was a Prussian pianist, composer and conductor.

Biography
He was born in Jersitz (Jeżyce) (now part of Poznań). He was initially taught by his father, an amateur violinist, pianist, conductor and composer. He entered the New Academy of Music in Berlin in 1869, where he studied piano under Theodor Kullak, harmony under Würst and counterpoint and composition with Kiel.

He became a teacher, and established the Nicodé Concerts. He accompanied Désirée Artôt on a concert tour of Galicia and Romania, then became professor at the Royal Conservatory in Dresden. Nicodé married Fanny Kinnell (1864-1916) in 1887. In 1888 he devoted himself entirely to composition.

Nicodé died at Langebrück near Dresden in 1919, aged 66.

Oeuvre
His works include Das Meer, Op. 31, a symphony for orchestra, organ, solo voices and men's chorus. His Gloria!, Op. 34 (1904), in six movements, for boy's voice, men's chorus, organ, harps, and very large orchestra occupies a whole evening in performance. His solitary symphony was published 1905 and performed in the first years after. Nicodé wrote other orchestral works, a Romanze for violin and orchestra, two cello sonatas, piano pieces and songs.

He also arranged Chopin's piano solo Allegro de concert, Op. 46, for piano and orchestra.  This followed his setting of the piece for two pianos.

The only complete recordings of Das Meer and Gloria! were made in 2013, realised digitally and free by Steffen Fahl in his online-project klassik resampled.de and streamed there among other works of Nicodé.

Works (selection)

Orchestral Music
 Maria Stuart, Op. 4
 Die Jagd nach dem Glück, Op. 11
 Romanze für Violine und Orchester, Op. 14
 Symphonische Suite, Op. 17
 Jubiläumsmarsch, Op. 20
 Faschingsbilder, Op. 24
 Symphonische Variationen, Op. 27
 Bilder aus dem Süden, Op. 29
 Das Meer, symphonic ode after Karl Woermann, Op. 31; includes: 1. Einleitung; 2. Das ist das Meer; 3. Wellenjagd; 4. Meeresleuchten; 5. Fata Morgana; 6. Ebbe und Flut.
 Märchen und Auf dem Lande, Op. 32
 Gloria! Ein Sturm- und Sonnenlied, Symphonie in einem Satze für Grosses Orchester, Orgel und (Schluss-)Chor, Op. 34; includes: 1. Vorverkündigung. Von Werdelust und tausend Zielen; 2. Durch's Feuer, durch die Schmiede; 3. Ein Sonnentag des Glücks; 4. Die stillste Stunde; 5. Um das Höchste; 6. Der neue Morgen.

Chamber music
 Cello Sonata No. 1 in B minor, Op. 23; movements: 1. Energisch bewegt; 2. Gemächlich; 3. Sehr schnell.
 Cello Sonata No. 2 in G, Op. 25; movements: 1. Allegro amabile; 2. Scherzo (à la Savoyarde). Vivace; 3. Larghetto; 4. Allegro animato.

Piano Music
 Charakteristische Polonaise, Op. 5
 Sechs Phantasiestücke: Andenken an Robert Schumann, Op. 6
 Aphorismen, Op. 8
 Charakterstücke, Op. 9
 Walzer-Capricen, Op. 10
 Etüden, Op. 12
 Italienische Volkslieder und Tänze, Op. 13; includes: 1. Tarantelle; 2. Canzonette; 3. Barcarolle; 4. Saltarello.
 Lieder, Op. 15
 Scherzo fantastique, Op. 16
 Variationen und Fuge über ein Originalthema, Op. 18, after Anton Rubinstein
 Piano Sonata in F minor, Op. 19; movements: 1. Allegro affettuoso; 2. Adagio ("Weihevoll und sehr gebunden vorzutragen"); 3. Menuett. In mässigem Tempo (♩= 92); 4. Rondo. Allegro agitato (Half note.png = 96).
 Etüden, Op. 21
 Ein Liebesleben, Op. 22
 Sonata, B minor, Op. 23
 Sonata G major, Op. 25
 Liederzyklus, Op. 30
 Erbarmen'', Op. 33

References

External links
 
 
 Digital realisations of Nicodé's Das Meer and Gloria by Steffen Fahl

1853 births
1919 deaths
19th-century classical composers
19th-century classical pianists
19th-century German composers
19th-century German male musicians
20th-century classical composers
20th-century German composers
20th-century German conductors (music)
20th-century German male musicians
German classical pianists
German male classical composers
German male conductors (music)
German male pianists
German Romantic composers
Academic staff of the Hochschule für Musik Carl Maria von Weber
Male classical pianists
Musicians from Poznań